Marin Datković (born 16 November 1988) is a football midfielder who has most recently played for HNK Rijeka in Croatia.

Club career
He was football educated at the Football Academy of NK Novalja and at the Football Academy of HNK Rijeka. On 2007, with his club HNK Rijeka he was a winner of the Croatian under-19 football cup 2007. In first half of the 2007-08 season he was loaned by HNK Rijeka (D-1 Croatia) to NK Orijent (D-3 Croatia) and since February 2008, he has been loaned by HNK Rijeka to NK Novalja (D-3 Croatia).

In the Summer of 2007 he scored one goal for HNK Rijeka against GAK Graz (Austria) in the Football Tournament for Young players Kvarnerska rivijera.

Personal life
His younger brother is Toni Datković and his father is Ivica Datkovic, the head coach of NK Novalja.

Statistics
05/2009 - 06/2011 HNK Rijeka (Prva HNL): 2 matches, 0 goals
2007-2008 NK Novalja (3rd Croatian League): -
2007-2008 NK Orijent (3rd Croatian League): 6 matches, 1 goal, 1 assist;
2006-2007 HNK Rijeka (1st Croatian League):
1st Croatian League U-19 years: 26 matches, 0 goals, 12 assists,
Croatian Cup U-19 years: 4 goals, 2 assists,

References

External links
 http://www.hnl-statistika.com/en_p1.asp?ID=1606

1988 births
Living people
Footballers from Rijeka
Association football midfielders
Croatian footballers
HNK Rijeka players
NK Novalja players
HNK Orijent players